Sushil Baldev Wadhwani  (born 7 December 1959) is a British economist who was a member of the Bank of England's Monetary Policy Committee from June 1999 to May 2002. He did his schooling from Mayo College, Ajmer in India and his further education at Stanmore Sixth Form College in the UK. He is also the founder and chief executive officer of Wadhwani Asset Management. Wadhwani was hired as an economic advisor to the Chancellor Jeremy Hunt in 2022.

References

1959 births
Living people
British people of Sindhi descent
Goldman Sachs people
Commanders of the Order of the British Empire
British hedge fund managers
British businesspeople of Indian descent
Monetary Policy Committee members